The following is a list of episodes 28–62 of the anime series Rurouni Kenshin. Directed by Kazuhiro Furuhashi and produced by Aniplex and Fuji TV, these episodes ran in Japan on Fuji TV from October 30, 1996, through to September 17, 1997. These 35 episodes are based on volumes 7-18 of the manga series of the same name by Nobuhiro Watsuki, and depicts the fight of the former assassin named Kenshin Himura, against his successor Makoto Shishio, who aims to conquer Japan.

The series was licensed for broadcast and home video release in North America by Media Blasters, who split it up into "seasons". They refer to their English dub of episodes 28–62 as season two. They were aired on Cartoon Network's Toonami programming block from April 23, 2003, through October 18, 2003. Media Blasters released this season within DVDs seven to fourteen of the anime from May 1, 2001, to November 13, 2001. A DVD compilation of all these episodes was released on January 17, 2006.

Five pieces of theme music are used during these episodes. The opening theme "Sobakasu" by Judy and Mary, continues to be used through episode 31. At episode 32 the opening changes to "1/2" by Makoto Kawamoto. Episode 28 begins using "Heart of Sword - Yoake Mae" by T.M. Revolution as the ending theme. The ending changes at episode 41 to "The Fourth Avenue Cafe" by L'Arc-en-Ciel. The theme changes back to "Heart of Sword - Yoake Mae" at episode 46, due to backlash from L'Arc-en-Ciel's drummer being arrested for heroin possession, then at episode 54 it changes again, this time to "It's Gonna Rain" by Bonnie Pink.


Episode list

References
General
 

Specific

1996 Japanese television seasons
1997 Japanese television seasons
Season 2